Anuketemheb ( "Anuket in Feast") was an ancient Egyptian princess and queen of the 19th or the 20th Dynasty. She is known from only one artifact, a red granite sarcophagus lid which was originally hers but was later reused for Takhat, the mother of Amenmesse and was discovered in the tomb KV10.

Anuketemheb's titles were "King's Daughter", "King's Wife" and "Great Royal Wife". Her father and husband could not be identified, but she is possibly identical with a princess depicted in a forecourt of the Temple of Luxor, in a procession of daughters of Ramesses II; her name is only partially readable but ends in em-heb.

Sources

Princesses of the Nineteenth Dynasty of Egypt
Great Royal Wives
People of the Twentieth Dynasty of Egypt